Rag, Bush and All is an album by Henry Threadgill released on the RCA Novus label in 1989.  The album and features four of Threadgill's compositions performed by Threadgill's Sextett with Bill Lowe, Ted Daniel, Fred Hopkins, Diedre Murray, Newman Baker and Reggie Nicholson.

Reception
The Allmusic review by Scott Yanow awarded the album 4½ stars, stating, "This CD from altoist Henry Threadgill is a perfect mixture of improvisation and composition, hanging onto devices of the past while creating new music... Highly recommended to open-eared listeners".

Track listing
All compositions by Henry Threadgill
 "Off the Rag" - 12:40  
 "The Devil is on the Loose and Dancin' with a Monkey" - 6:44  
 "Gift" - 5:44  
 "Sweet Holy Rag" - 13:20 
Recorded at Clinton Recording Studios, New York City in December 1988

Personnel
Henry Threadgill - alto saxophone, bass flute
Ted Daniel - trumpet, flugelhorn
Bill Lowe - bass trombone
Diedre Murray - cello
Fred Hopkins - bass
Reggie Nicholson - percussion
Newman Baker - percussion

References

1988 albums
Henry Threadgill albums
Novus Records albums